Reeth Rishya Tennison (born 27 April 1995) is an Indian table tennis player. As of 2021, she is the second top-ranked female table tennis player in India and ranked 118th in the world as of March 2022. She represented India in the 2022 Commonwealth Games Birmingham.

Early life
Reeth Rishya born 27 April 1995 in  Chennai, Tamil Nadu. She is married to Sanil Shetty

Career
Reeth has won her first international pro tour by winning the ITTF Ecuador Open, 2021.

References 

1995 births
Living people
Indian female table tennis players
21st-century Indian women
21st-century Indian people